The Miracle of Our Lady of Fatima is a Warner Color feature film made in 1952. It was promoted as a fact-based treatment of the events surrounding the apparitions of Our Lady of Fátima, in Portugal, in 1917.

It stars Susan Whitney as Lúcia dos Santos, Sherry Jackson as Jacinta Marto and Sammy Ogg as Francisco Marto, with Gilbert Roland as a fictional character named Hugo, a kindly but agnostic friend of the three children, who rediscovered his faith in God through the Miracle of the Sun. The musical score by Max Steiner received an Academy Award nomination. The film was released on DVD on April 4, 2006.

Plot 
It is 1917. Portugal is feeling the after-effects of a storm of anti-religious sentiment and the violent overthrow of the monarchy and the government in the 5 October 1910 revolution. Churches in Lisbon and the rest of Portugal are boarded up. Many priests, nuns, monks and friars are shown being fingerprinted, photographed and registered as possible criminals before being jailed. The rural town of Fátima is small enough to have escaped much of this persecution; their church remains open, and most of the people are reasonably devout.

Watching their flocks and playing in a field outside town on May 15 (the actual date of the first apparition was May 13), Lúcia Santos (Susan Whitney) and her cousins, Jacinta Marto (Sherry Jackson) and Francisco Marto (Sammy Ogg) decide to pray their version of the Rosary by yelling out, "Hail Mary!" but not finishing the prayer. In the midst of this activity, they hear a clap of thunder and see a flash of lightning from a distance. Thinking it is about to rain, the children gather their sheep and head for their homes. Another flash of lightning causes them to run straight into an unusual "cloud of light" surrounding a little tree on which a mysterious Lady stands. Speaking slowly and gently, the Lady asks them to return on the 13th of each month, and to offer their sufferings to God for the salvation of sinners. She entreats them to say the Rosary for world peace. Later, they encounter their agnostic friend Hugo da Silva (Gilbert Roland), who tells them it is best not to reveal the vision to anyone else, but of course on returning home, Jacinta immediately divulges her sightings.

Jacinta and Francisco's parents quickly believe the story, but Lúcia's mother reacts with disgust and subjects her daughter to emotional and physical abuse. She forbids Lúcia to return to the Cova da Iria, but Lúcia does so anyway on the next month's appearance (June 13), and is told by the Lady that her cousins will die and go to heaven "soon", while she will live a long life in holy service. The parish priest, Father Ferreira (Richard Hale), suggests the visions might be from Satan. The local authorities close the Fátima church until the priest can convince the parishioners that no visions have or will happen. The next month, on July 13, the Lady appears again, predicting "another and worse war" (World War II) will happen if the world doesn't stop sinning. She also predicts evil will come from Russia if that nation is unconverted. Kidnapped by provincial administrator Artur Santos (Frank Silvera; unrelated to Lúcia Santos), the children are first offered bribes, then threatened with death if they do not change their story. Trying to frighten them, he has first Jacinta, then Francisco dragged into another room. Jacinta's terrified screams convince Lúcia that her cousins are dead, but she refuses to deny what she has seen. Warning her that she is about to experience "the full treatment", Artur Santos reunites her with her cousins, who are alive, then throws them all in jail. There they find Hugo, who stands by them as they convince all the prisoners to join in praying the Rosary.

Unable to find any prosecutable evidence, Artur Santos frees the children, who find that the entire population of Fátima has been standing outside, praying and waiting for them.

On October 13, when the Lady promised "a sign that will make them believe", about forty thousand people arrive, waiting through a torrential downpour. The Lady appears and says that the war (World War I) will be over soon and the soldiers will be returning to their homes. At precisely noon, as the Lady raises her hand, the clouds part and sunlight shines brightly upon all the people — then the Sun shifts through a rainbow of colours and appears to move closer, in what many have described as the Miracle of the Sun. Many people panic, some pray or watch calmly, and a few sick and disabled people are healed. As the Sun returns to normal, Hugo stands in the middle of the kneeling crowd, his hat still on. Removing it, he says "Only the fool sayeth there is no God."

A short epilogue, circa 1951, shows the huge basilica where the tree once stood, and a million people outside paying homage to Our Lady of Fátima. At the end of the film, inside the new basilica (where the Cova da Iria once was), Lúcia is now a nun praying before the tomb of her cousins, the converted Hugo at her side.

Cast 
 Susan Whitney as Lúcia dos Santos  
 Sherry Jackson as Jacinta Marto  
 Sammy Ogg as Francisco Marto
 Gilbert Roland as Hugo da Silva  
 Angela Clarke as Maria Rosa dos Santos  
 Jay Novello as António dos Santos  
 Frank Silvera as Arturo dos Santos  
 Richard Hale as Father Ferreira  
 Norman Rice as Manuel Marto  
 Frances Morris as Olímpia Marto
 Carl Milletaire as District Magistrate
 J. Carroll Naish as Narrator 
 Ethan Laidlaw as Villager (uncredited) 
 Jack Mower as Villager (uncredited)
 Virginia Gibson as Virgin Mary (uncredited)

See also
 Our Lady of Fátima
 Cova da Iria in Fátima
 Sanctuary of Fátima
 Parish Church of Fátima
 Fatima, 2020 film
 The Song of Bernadette, 1943 film

References

External links 

 
 
 
 

Our Lady of Fátima
1952 films
Films about Catholicism
Films about Christianity
Marian apparitions in film
Films scored by Max Steiner
Films set in 1917
Films directed by John Brahm
Warner Bros. films
Films set in Portugal
1950s English-language films
American films based on actual events
American drama films
1950s American films